Montgomery Rocks comprises a pair of rocky dolerite and limestone islets, with a combined area of 3.69 ha and a high point of 50 m, part of the Hibbs Pyramid Group, lying close to the central western coast of Tasmania.

Fauna
Recorded breeding seabird and wader species are the little penguin (60 pairs), short-tailed shearwater (560 pairs), fairy prion (760 pairs), common diving-petrel (100 pairs), Pacific gull and sooty oystercatcher.  The metallic skink is present.

References

Islands of South West Tasmania